Perfect Match is a dating game show that aired on Channel 4 from 18 September 2001 to 4 September 2003 and was narrated by Ken Lorimer.

External links

2001 British television series debuts
2003 British television series endings
2000s British game shows
Channel 4 game shows
English-language television shows
Television series by Banijay